This is a list of the 30 constituencies currently represented in the Parliament of Barbados, as at the February 2013 general election. From 1971, each constituency has been represented by a single Member of Parliament (MP). The number of seats were increased from 28 to 30 just ahead of the 2003 elections.

History
After Barbados was settled by the Kingdom of England, a House of Burgesses was established to conduct the business of governance in the colony along with the Governor.  From an early date, if not the beginning, there were two members of the House of Assembly for each parish; in 1843 two members were added for Bridgetown, bringing the total to 24 Members. In 1971 dual representatives for each constituency were abolished in favour of single seat ridings and the entire island was divided into 24 constituencies.  In 1981 three more constituencies were created; thus bring the total to 27.  By the election of 1991 a 28th was added, and finally ahead of the 2003 general election two more were added bringing the national total to 30.  As of 2011 the Electoral and Boundaries Commission decided that no new constituencies would be needed. However, there was a subsequent call made by the media that St. Philip-South's population was now too large and was disproportionate to all other constituencies. Despite the call, Barbados held the 2013 elections without adding any new constituencies.

List of constituencies

See also 
 Electoral calendar
 Electoral system
 List of electoral districts by nation

References

Further reading

External links 
 Adam Carr's Election Archive
 Barbados Parliament – Constituency Maps of Barbados

Barbados
Constituencies
Politics of Barbados